RFR may refer to:
 Radio Free Roscoe, a Canadian TV series
 Ralph Firman Racing, a British racecar constructor
 Recovering from Religion, an organisation
 Regional Fast Rail project, Victoria, Australia
 Reichsforschungsrat (RFR, Reich Research Council)
 Réseau Ferroviaire Rapide, a rail network in Tunisia
 RFR Engineers, a design engineering firm
 RFR Holding
 Right of first refusal
 Rio Frio, Costa Rica, ICAO airport code
 Steyr Scout RFR rifle
 Team RFR, a Russian auto racing team 
 Roush Fenway Racing, a NASCAR team